Macroglossum melanoleuca is a moth of the  family Sphingidae. It is known from Sumba in Indonesia.

References

Macroglossum
Moths described in 2001